The 2001 Vanderbilt Commodores football team represented the Vanderbilt University in the 2001 NCAA Division I-A football season.  Led by head coach Woody Widenhofer in his fifth year as the head coach, the Commodores finished with a 2–9 record for the season.

Vanderbilt top players

Vanderbilt was led by Greg Zolman who passed for 2,512 yards with 14 TD's and 9 INT's he had a 52.1% passing 186 Completes for 357 Attempts 32.5 Attempts per game. Dan Stricker was the top passing target with 65 Receptions and 1,079 Yards 8 TDs. Lew Thomas was top rusher with 675 Yards on 105 Attempts for an Avg of 6.43 and 96.4 YPG 5TDs. Rodney Williams was second in rushing with 590 Yards on 131 Attempts for an Avg of 4.50 4TDs.

Woody Widenhofer

Widenhofer, entered into his fifth season at Vandy, on the hot seat needing to improve his record at Vanderbilt. He met with Vanderbilt chancellor Gordon Gee and athletic director Todd Turner in November 2000. The gist of that meeting was clearly defined: There needed to be marked improvement in every aspect of the Vanderbilt program if Widenhofer is going to see a sixth year.
The general feeling in Nashville was that Vanderbilt needs to make a bid for a winning season. And if the Commodores don’t get to six wins, they need to at least come very close.

To that end, Widenhofer implemented a three-part plan during the off-season. There was some talk that he might make some changes on his staff. While he did shuffle some things around, he didn’t fire anyone. But Widenhofer had vowed to take a more "hands-on" approach the season with his staff and players.
The second part of Widenhofer's plan was to spreading out the special teams responsibilities to every member of the coaching staff. Bill Maskill handled those chores in the last season by himself.

The third part of Widenhofer's plan was to center around developing leadership among the players. He thought his team lacked leadership the year before.
The Commodores returned seven starters on each side of the ball. But the loss of Jared McGrath and Elliott Carson on offense and Jamie Winborn and Jimmy R. Williams  on defense could not have been overlooked.
New play-makers needed to emerge. And above all, Vanderbilt needed to do a better job of running the ball and stopping the run if it was going to improve on the 2000 season's 3-8 finish. The Commodores were last in the league in rushing offense (96.5 yards) and tied for last in rushing defense (178.3 yards).

Offense

The offense was clearly the strength of this team and had a chance to be one of the best Vanderbilt had had in some time. But the Commodores needed a few receivers other than junior Dan Stricker to make some plays. 2000 Season, Stricker finished third in the SEC and 18th nationally with 90.4 receiving yards per game.
Senior QB Greg Zolman entering his fifth year in the program and coming off his most productive season. Zolman had the kind of stability at quarterback Vanderbilt had not had much of over the years.

In 2000 Zolman finished second only to Kentucky's Jared Lorenzen in passing yards per game. Zolman averaged 221.9 yards and had 2,441 for the 2000 season, the most by a Vanderbilt quarterback since 1988.

The year before, the Commodores were last in the league in rushing offense, averaging just 3.1 yards per carry. McGrath was the main cog in the rushing attack, and was gone after moving to fourth on Vandy's all-time rushing list.

Defense

Defense had been a constant under Widenhofer. That is, until the 2000 season. The Commodores fell off in just about every area. They were 11th in the league in total defense, 10th in scoring defense and tied for 12th in rushing defense.

Good defense always starts in the defensive line, and the Commodores weren’t loaded by any means in their three-man front.
The best defensive lineman on the team was red shirt sophomore nose guard Brett Beard. He had 50 tackles, including two sacks.
With Winborn giving up his final year of eligibility and being scooped up in the second round of the NFL draft, junior Mike Adam would get the chance fill Winborn's inside linebacker position.

Lance Garner of Kempner, Texas was the heir apparent to kicker John Markham, who departed as the Commodores’ all-time leading scorer. Markham, who made 14-of-18 field goals in 2000, was the second place-kicker taken in April's NFL draft, going to the New York Giants in the fifth round 162 pick.

Bottom line

Widenhofer did not make any bold predictions for the year. His only comment to the media before the start of spring practice in March was that he was "cautiously optimistic" about the 2001 season.

Widenhofer learned his lesson about making predictions after the 3-8 finish 2000 season.
Due to the fact that Vanderbilt won only 2 games, Vanderbilt let Widenhofer go after the season and hired Bobby Johnson.

Coaching staff

Schedule

Game summaries

Middle Tennessee State 37 Vanderbilt 28
For the first time in 13 games MTSU defeated in-state rival Vanderbilt 37 to 28. This was the first meeting since 1956 the teams are approximately 25 miles apart. MTSU running back Dwone Hicks rushed the ball 37 times for 203 yards and QB Wes Counts was 13 of 36 passes for 308 yards as Middle Tennessee won a season-opening game on the road for the first time since 1994 at Tennessee State. Vanderbilt QB Greg Zolman was 13 of 32 for 300 yards passing. Vanderbilt scored 28 points in the second quarter to go into halftime with a 28 to 24 point lead. Middle Tennessee would go on to score 13 unanswered points for the win. 

Scoring summary
 MTSU- Hicks 1 run (Kelly kick)
 MTSU- Hicks 1 run (Kelly kick)
 Vandy- R Williams 3 run (Folino kick)
 Vandy- L Thomas 26 run (Folino kick)
 MTSU- FG Kelly 22
 Vandy- Stricker 48 pass from Zolman (Folino kick)
 MTSU- Hicks 1 run (Kelly kick)
 Vandy- M Garrett 73 pass from Zolman (Folino kick)
 MTSU- Hicks 2 run (kick failed)
 MTSU- Counts 9 run (Kelly kick)

Player statistics
 Rushing
 Middle Tenn – Hicks 37-203, Lee 7-48, Wright 2-31, Counts 6-18.
 Vanderbilt – L Thomas 7-71, R Williams 12-60, Stricker 2-25, Young 2-23, Zolman 3-11, Mathenia 1-1, Purkey 1-minus 14.
 Passing
 Middle Tenn – Counts 27-36-0-308
 Vanderbilt – Zolman 13-32-0-300
 Receiving
 Middle Tenn – K Newson 9-113, T Calico 6-83, H Johnson 5-48, Youell 4-34, Lee 2-22, Payne 1-8.
 Vanderbilt – M Garrett 8-219, Stricker 3-70, Hasanoglu 1-9, R Williams 1-2.

Team stats
 Middle Tenn/ Vanderbilt
 First downs 37/ 17
 Rushed-yards 52-300/ 28-177
 Passing yards 308 /300
 Sacked-yards lost 2-15/ 0-0
 Return yards 20 /26
 Passes 27-36-0/ 13-32-0
 Punts 3-42.7 /5-43.6
 Fumbles-lost 2-1/ 2-0
 Penalties-yards 9-56/ 11-83
 Time of possession 39:55/ 20:05

Alabama 12 Vanderbilt 9
This was Dennis Franchione's first win at Alabama as ahead football coach. With 5:01 remaining in the game Neal Thomas' fourth field goal sealed the victory for the Crimson Tide. Earlier in the week, Alabama had received official word from the NCAA detailing rules allegations that include payoffs and academic fraud. Chuck Folino kicked three field goals for the Commodores, who started the season 0–2 and 0–1 SEC West.

This was the 17th consecutive victory for Alabama over Vanderbilt and had an overall record of 55–19–4 over Vanderbilt. Entering the fourth period Alabama had a 3-point lead when Folino tied the game with a 38-yarder and 7:10 to play. Vanderbilt's Greg Zolman was 17 of 34 for 253 yards passing. Lew Thomas had 10 carries for 89 yards rushing. Alabama's Ahmad Galloway rushed the ball 24 times for 144 yards. Alabama's record was 1–1 and 1–0 in the SEC East.

Scoring summary
 Vanderbilt- FG Folino 20
 Alabama- FG N Thomas 35
 Alabama- FG N Thomas 26
 Vanderbilt- FG Folino 25
 Alabama- FG N Thomas 31
 Vanderbilt- FG Folino 38
 Alabama- FG Thomas 27

Player statistics
 Rushing
 Alabama – Galloway 24-144, Hudson 11-69, T Watts 8-16.
 Vanderbilt – L Thomas 10-89, R Williams 14-32, Stricker 3-16, Mathenia 1-7, Zolman 6-5, Team 1-minus 6.
 Passing
 Alabama – T Watts 10-17-0-128.
 Vanderbilt – Zolman 17-34-0-253, Stricker 0-1-0-0.
 Receiving
 Alabama – A Carter 3-30, Luke 2-28, T Jones Jr. 2 – 28, Th Sanders 1-26, F Milons 1-8, Collins 1-8.
 Vanderbilt – Stricker 3-75, Smith 3-73, Mathenia 3-41, R Williams 3-23, Hatcher 2-27, M Garrett 1-9, L Thomas 1-5, Hasanoglu 1-0.

Team statistics
  Alabama /Vanderbilt
 First downs 17 /20
 Rushed-yards 43-229/ 35-143
 Passing yards 128 /253
 Sacked-yards lost 1-7 /2-12
 Return yards 12 /0
 Passes 10-17-0 /17-35-0
 Punts 3-28.3 /3-57.0
 Fumbles-lost 0-0/ 0-0
 Penalties-yards 4-30 /6-33
 Time of possession 30:19/ 29:41

Richmond 22 – Vanderbilt 28
Vanderbilt rallied back in the third quarter with two Lew Thomas 1-yard rushing touchdowns. This was Vandy's first victory of the year; it was over a D I-AA Richmond Spiders, who were (0 2) Richmond made it a close game on a Scott Fulton three yard run with 4:14 remaining in the fourth quarter. Richmond had lost to Virginia on September 1, 2001 17 16 both losses were to a Division I-A school.

Richmond took a 10–0 lead in the first quarter, on Gustus' four-yard TD run and Doug Kirchner's 31-yard field goal. Richmond was ahead 16   with 4:06 remaining in the first half. Vandy closed to 16–14 gaining momentum on Greg Zolman's second TD pass a 12 pass to Dan Stricker with 0:39 left remaining in the second quarter. Vanderbilt scored its first points on a 41-yard pass Zoleman to Stricker with 0;04 remaining in the first quarter.

This was the first meeting of the teams Richmond had a record of 0–12 all time against the SEC. Vanderbilt's Greg Zolman completed 20 of 32 passes for 236 yards, Lew Thomas rushed 93 yards on 15 carries.  Dan Striker had 6 receptions for 84 yards and 2 TD's. Richmond's Gustus completed 6 passes of 14 for 125 yards and ran for 54 yards on 18 attempts.

Scoring summary
 Richmond- Gatus 4 run (Kirchner kick)
 Richmond- FG Kirchner 31
 Vanderbilt- Stricker 41 pass from Zolman (Stover kick)
 Richmond- Gatus 1 run (kick failed)
 Vanderbilt- Stricker 12 pass from Zolman (Stover kick)
 Vanderbilt- L Thomas 1 run (Zolman run for two-point conversion)
 Vanderbilt- L Thomas 1 run (two point conversion failed)
 Richmond- Fulton 3 run (two point conversion failed)

Player statistics
 Rushing
 Richmond – Gustus 18-54, Purnell 8-35, D Wills 6-30, Diggs 5-21, Fulton 6-20, Edwards 4-18, Roane 2-7, Alkebu-lan 1-4, Team 1-minus 20.
 Vanderbilt – L Thomas 15-93, Zolman 3-9, Hasanoglu 1-9, R Williams 6-5, Hatcher 1-0.
 Passing
 Richmond – Gustus 6-14-0-125, D Wills 2-4-0-16.
 Vanderbilt – Zolman 20-32-0-236.
 Receiving
 Richmond – Mcnair 3-69, Roane 3-52, Purnell 2-20.
 Vanderbilt – Stricker 6-84, M Garrett 4-46, Hatcher 3-61, Hasanoglu 2-15, Simone 1-10, Mathenia 1-9, C Brancheau 1-7, L Thomas 1-3, E Robinson 1-1.

Team Stats
  Richmond/ Vanderbilt
 First downs 17 /16
 Rushed-yards 51-169/ 26-116
 Passing yards 141/ 236
 Sacked-yards lost 0-0/ 0-0
 Return yards 15 20
 Passes 8-18-0 /20-32-0
 Punts 4-34.5/ 5-32.8
 Fumbles-lost 2-0/ 1-1
 Penalties-yards 8-66/ 7-44
 Time of possession 35:47/ 24:13

Auburn 24 Vanderbilt 21

Vanderbilt and Auburn Tigers had played only 10 time between 1955 and 2001. Auburn won them all the previous three meetings Auburn out scored Vanderbilt 78–17. This was a hard fought game by Vandy as the teams where tied 3 times in the game.

Auburn scored first on Chris Williams 51 yard touchdown run with 2:08 into the game. Vanderbilt scored on a four-yard run by Lew Thomas with 8:43 in the third quarter and Tigers' freshman quarterback Jason Campbell passed to Robert Johnson for a 35-yard touchdown pass  1:11 later. The Commodores tied again on a two-yard run by Thomas in the third before the Tigers' scored again on a one-yard run by Williams with 0:50 left in the third.

The fourth Vanderbilt marched 83-yards and scored on a Dan Stricker four-yard reception from Zolman for Vandy's final point of the game. The Tigers' scored last on a Damon Duval's 49 yard field goal with 2:58 remaining in the game. Vanderbilt made an effort to get into field goal range, however turned the ball over on downs after driving 52 yards.

Scoring summary
 Auburn – C Williams 51 run (Duval kick)
 Vanderbilt – L Thomas 4 run (Stover kick)
 Auburn – Ro Johnson 35 pass from Campbell (Duval kick)
 Vanderbilt – L Thomas 2 run (Stover kick)
 Auburn – C Williams 1 run (Duval kick)
 Vanderbilt – Stricker 4 pass from Zolman (Stover kick)
 Auburn – FG Duval 49

Player statistics
 Rushing
 Auburn – C Williams 6-56, C Moore 11-23, Campbell 9-22, B Johnson 1-7, Team 1-minus 1.
 Vanderbilt – L Thomas 27-173, R Williams 3-8, Team 1-minus 1, Purkey 1-minus 2, Zolman 5-minus 10.
 Passing
 Auburn – Campbell 17-24-0-247.
 Vanderbilt – Zolman 20-42-1-162, Stricker 0-1-0-0.
 Receiving
 Auburn – M Willis 4-87, Ro Johnson 4-56, Carter 3-38, C Moore 3-38, Diamond 1-11, D Green 1-10, J Walkins 1-7.
 Vanderbilt – Stricker 6-63, M Garrett 3-16, Hasanoglu 2-26, R Williams 2-13, Simone 2-9, Young 2-5, Smith 1-19, Hatcher 1-8, L Thomas 1-3.

Team stats
 Auburn / Vanderbilt
 First downs 13 / 18
 Rushed-yards 28-107 / 37-168
 Passing yards 247 /162
 Sacked-yards lost 2-25  /1-11
 Return yards 57 / 45
 Passes 17-24-0 /20-43-1
 Punts 6-45.5 / 7-37.0
 Fumbles-lost 4-2 /1-1
 Penalties-yards 10-89 /5-50
 Time of possession 26:11/33:49

#19 Georgia 30 Vanderbilt 14

Scoring summary
 Georgia – M Smith 3 run (Bennett kick)
 Georgia – M Smith 40 run (Bennett kick)
 Georgia – Gibson 58 pass from Da Greene (Bennett kick)
 Vanderbilt – M Garrett 8 pass from Zolman (Folino kick)
 Georgia – FG Bennett 27
 Vanderbilt – Zolman 1 run (Folino kick)
 Georgia – Edwards 17 pass from Da Greene (two-point conversion failed)

Player statistics
 Rushing
 Georgia – M Smith 9-69, Haynes 7-25, Gibson 1-22, Sanks 4-21, K Bailey 3-12, Team 1-minus 1, Da Greene 6-minus 9.
 Vanderbilt – L Thomas 23-75, R Williams 3-28, Stricker 1-15, Mathenia 2-14, Zolman 9-minus 12.
 Passing
 Georgia – Da Greene 19-26-0-305.
 Vanderbilt – Zolman 24-50-0-316.
 Receiving
 Georgia – Gibson 6-106, Haynes 3-88, Mcmichael 3-44, Edwards 3-35, Mitchell 2-13, Watson 1-10, K Bailey 1-9.
 Vanderbilt – Stricker 8-137, Mathenia 6-78, L Thomas 4-27, M Garrett 2-17, Simone 2-6, Young 1-49, Hasanoglu 1-2.

Team stats
  Georgia/ Vanderbilt
 First downs 20/ 23
 Rushed-yards 31-139/ 38-120
 Passing yards 305 /316
 Sacked-yards lost 2-12/ 1-14
 Return yards 0 /11
 Passes 19-26-0 /24-50-0
 Punts 5-45.8 /73-36.3
 Fumbles-lost 3-3 /2-1
 Penalties-yards 12-76/ 9-79
 Time of possession 25:20/ 34:40

At# 16 South Carolina 46 Vanderbilt 14
Vanderbilt was blown-out by South Carolina and the team was weakening. Before the Georgia game all games where close the next 5 SEC team would do the same thing to the down and out Dores. Other than Duke Vandy was at least a 14-point underdog.

Scoring summary
 South Carolina -TD: BRIAN SCOTT 41 Yard Pass From PHIL PETTY (DANIEL WEAVER Kick), 3:53
 South Carolina – TD: DEREK WATSON 7 Yard Run (DANIEL WEAVER Kick), 12:48
 Vanderbilt – TD: GREG ZOLMAN 1 Yard Run (CHUCK FOLINO Kick), 6:36
 South Carolina – FG: DANIEL WEAVER 42 Yard, 9:55
 South Carolina – SAFETY: 13:50
 Vanderbilt – TD: TOM SIMONE 19 Yard Pass From GREG ZOLMAN (CHUCK FOLINO Kick), 1:38
 South Carolina – TD: ANDREW PINNOCK 15 Yard Run (DANIEL WEAVER Kick), 5:06
 South Carolina – TD: CHAVEZ DONNINGS 14 Yard Pass From PHIL PETTY (TWO-POINT CONVERSION FAILED), 9:43
 South Carolina – TD: COREY JENKINS 5 Yard Run (DANIEL WEAVER Kick), 1:16
 South Carolina – TD: WILLIS HAM 10 Yard Pass From DONDRIAL PINKINS (DANIEL WEAVER Kick), 7:02

At Duke 28 Vanderbilt 42
Vanderbilt has its only road win and last win of the year, to a Duke team that was 0–7 before the Vandy game, and finished 0–11.

Scoring summary
 Duke – Wade 1 run (Garber kick)
 Vanderbilt – Stricker 45 pass from Zolman (Folino kick)
 Vanderbilt – R Williams 1 run (Folino kick)
 Duke – Brzezinski 4 pass from Bryant (Garber kick)
 Vanderbilt – R Williams 2 run (Folino kick)
 Vanderbilt – M Garrett 54 pass from Zolman (Folino kick)
 Vanderbilt – Mathenia 13 run (Folino kick)
 Duke – Bryant 1 run (kick failed)
 Duke – M Hart 31 pass from Bryant (M Hart reception for two-point conversion)
 Vanderbilt – Zolman 6 run (Folino kick)

Player statistics
 Rushing
 Vanderbilt – R Williams 18-155, L Thomas 8-123, Zolman 10-32, Mathenia 2-16, Stricker 1-9, Hatcher 1-3.
 Duke – Douglas 29-169, Wade 16-39, Sharpe 1-13, K Moore 2-11, Bryant 8-3, Dargan 1-3.
 Passing
 Vanderbilt – Zolman 8-18-0-168, Olmstead 1-1-0-7.
 Duke – Bryant 19-36-4-295, Mcdonald 1-1-0-4.
 Receiving
 Vanderbilt – Stricker 4-101, Hatcher 2-3, M Garrett 1-54, R Williams 1-10, L Thomas 1-7.
 Duke – M Hart 4-86, Wade 4-38, Erdeljac 3-52, Sharpe 3-24, Love 2-36, Brzezinski 2-26, K Moore 1-37, Douglas 1-0.

Team stats
  Vanderbilt /Duke
 First downs 16 /28
 Rushed-yards 40-338/ 57-238
 Passing yards 175 /299
 Sacked-yards lost 1-4/ 2-20
 Return yards 87 /8
 Passes 9-19-0 /20-37-4
 Punts 4-37.8 /3-39.0
 Fumbles-lost 4-2 /3-1
 Penalties-yards 7-86 /7-55
 Time of possession 23:33/ 36:27

At #4 Florida 71 Vanderbilt 13

"I don't really like these kind of games", Spurrier said. "We got way ahead early and you can tell Vandy had lost their spirit, lost their fight somewhat. Sometimes these kinds of wins could be misleading to your players. So hopefully we don't get too full of ourselves and think we're that many points better than anybody."

Scoring summary
 Florida – Graham 2 run (Chandler kick)
 Florida – Graham 5 run (Chandler kick)
 Florida – Gaffney 7 pass from Grossman (Chandler kick)
 Florida – FG Chandler 37
 Florida – T Jacobs 13 pass from Grossman (Chandler kick)
 Florida – Caldwell 20 pass from Grossman (kick failed)
 Florida – Davis 25 interception return (Chandler kick)
 Florida – T Jacobs 2 pass from Berlin (Talcott kick)
 Florida – Green 5 run (Talcott kick)
 Florida – Perez 15 pass from Berlin (Talcott kick)
 Florida – Wells 6 pass from Berlin (kick failed)
 Vanderbilt – B Walker 27 run (Folino kick)
 Vanderbilt – B Walker 2 run (kick failed)

Player statistics
 Rushing
 Vanderbilt – N Mckenzie 5-37, R Williams 15-34, B Walker 4-33, Mathenia 2-5, Hatcher 1-1, Webb 1-minus 8, Zolman 7-minus 12, Olmstead 3-minus 27.
 Florida – Green 11-49, R Carthon 9-39, Graham 9-35, Gillespie 3-14, Grossman 3-12, Perez 1-12, Kight 1-7.
 Passing
 Vanderbilt – Zolman 8-17-1-80, Olmstead 5-9-1-81, B Walker 2-3-0-48, Team 0-1-0-0.
 Florida – Grossman 17-29-1-306, Berlin 7-9-0-74, Creveling 1-2-0-23.
 Receiving
 Vanderbilt – Stricker 5-87, R Williams 4-44, Mathenia 2-24, Smith 1-43, N Mckenzie 1-6, Hasanoglu 1-5, Hatcher 1-0.
 Florida – T Jacobs 6-105, Caldwell 4-117, Gaffney 4-55, M Jackson 2-37, Perez 2-32, Gillespie 2-15, Haugabrook 1-23, Graham 1-9, Wells 1-6, R Carthon 1-3, Roberts 1-1.

Team stats
  Vanderbilt /Florida
 First downs 14 /28
 Rushed-yards 38-63/ 37-168
 Passing yards 209 /403
 Sacked-yards lost 6-44/ 0-0
 Return yards 8 /94
 Passes 15-30-2/ 25-40-1
 Punts 7-26.6 /0-0.0
 Fumbles-lost 3-3 /3-2
 Penalties-yards 3-28 /9-59
 Time of possession 30:35/ 29:25

Kentucky 56 Vanderbilt 30

Jared Lorenzen threw for a season-high 453 yards and a career-high six touchdowns to lead Kentucky to a 56-30 rout over Vanderbilt in a Southeastern Conference matchup.

Dan Stricker caught 12 passes for a career-high 204 yards and two touchdowns for Vanderbilt. Rodney Williams had four catches for a season-high 102 yards and rushed for 85 yards on 18 carries.

Scoring summary
 Vanderbilt – Stricker 2 pass from Zolman (kick failed)
 Kentucky – Abney 52 pass from Lorenzen (kick failed)
 Kentucky – D Smith 43 pass from Lorenzen (Hanson kick)
 Vanderbilt – Stricker 21 pass from Zolman (Folino kick)
 Kentucky – Cook 21 pass from Lorenzen (Hanson kick)
 Kentucky – FG Hanson 27
 Kentucky – Ja White 82 fumble return (Hanson kick)
 Vanderbilt – R Williams 2 run (Stover kick)
 Kentucky – D Smith 51 pass from Lorenzen (Hanson kick)
 Vanderbilt – Zolman 1 run (Stover kick)
 Kentucky – Abney 5 pass from Lorenzen (kick failed)
 Vanderbilt – FG Stover 23
 Kentucky – Pinner 1 run (kick failed)
 Kentucky – Cook 28 pass from Lorenzen (Hanson kick)

Player statistics
 Rushing
 Kentucky – Pinner 9-33, M Johnson 6-33, Lorenzen 5-32, C Scott 8-15, Boyd 1-11, Cook 1-6.
 Vanderbilt – R Williams 18-76, N Mckenzie 4-24, B Walker 2-15, Mathenia 2-1, Stricker 1-1, Zolman 8-minus 15.
 Passing
 Kentucky – Lorenzen 26-37-0-453.
 Vanderbilt – Zolman 29-45-1-441, B Walker 0-2-0-0, Young 1-1-0-minus 1.
 Receiving
 Kentucky – Abney 7-113, Cook 5-77, D Smith 4-130, C Scott 3-27, Allen 2-33, C Harp 1-22, Pinner 1-20, Simms 1-15, Kelly 1-11, Boone 1-5.
 Vanderbilt – Stricker 12-204, M Garrett 5-58, R Williams 4-102, Smith 3-38, Hasanoglu 2-12, Hatcher 1-18, E Robinson 1-5, C Brancheau 1-4, Zolman 1-minus 1.

Team stats
  Kentucky /Vanderbilt
 First downs 26 /34
 Rushed-yards 30-130/ 35-102
 Passing yards 453 /440
 Sacked-yards lost 1-11/ 4-24
 Return yards 114 /9
 Passes 26-37-0 /30-48-1
 Punts 2-51.0 /3-42.7
 Fumbles-lost 1-1 /2-2
 Penalties-yards 14-133/ 6-42
 Time of possession 27:48/ 32:12

At #7 Tennessee 38 Vanderbilt 0

"There is plenty to worry about this week", Tennessee coach Phillip Fulmer said. "We were able to get through this one and play a lot of people, but we have a lot of people banged up. Right now, our focus and attention is to get ready for Florida."

Scoring summary
 Tennessee – FG A Walls 37
 Tennessee – FG A Walls 27
 Tennessee – Washington 10 pass from Clausen (D Stallworth reception for two-point conversion)
 Tennessee – D Stallworth 55 punt return (A Walls kick)
 Tennessee – D Stallworth 80 pass from Clausen (A Walls kick)
 Tennessee – FG A Walls 42
 Tennessee – Houston 20 run (Chauvin kick)

Player statistics
 Rushing
 Vanderbilt – R Williams 21-72, N Mckenzie 3-20, B Walker 1-17, Mathenia 1-4, Stricker 1-2, Zolman 9-minus 54.
 Tennessee – T Stephens 16-65, Houston 5-54, Davis 5-43, Clausen 1-10, Tinsley 2-7, Mathews 3-4, Fleming 2-3, Bartholomew 1-3.
 Passing
 Vanderbilt – Zolman 17-26-2-144, B Walker 0-1-1-0.
 Tennessee – Clausen 20-29-0-278, Mathews 1-2-0-7.
 Receiving
 Vanderbilt – Stricker 6-41, Mathenia 4-40, Hasanoglu 2-18, R Williams 2-11, Young 1-15, Simone 1-14, M Garrett 1-5.
 Tennessee – Washington 6-60, D Stallworth 4-128, Graham 3-32, T Stephens 3-15, Witten 2-38, Scott 1-7, M Jones 1-4, Parker 1-1

Team stats
 Vanderbilt /Tennessee
 First downs 16 /22
 Rushed-yards 36-61/ 35-189
 Passing yards 144 /285
 Sacked-yards lost 5-56/ 0-0
 Return yards 0 /133
 Passes 17-27-3 /21-31-0
 Punts 6-45.7 /1-44.0
 Fumbles-lost 1-0 /3-2
 Penalties-yards 8-60 /10-96
 Time of possession 31:50/ 28:10

At Ole Miss 38 Vanderbilt 27
Ole Miss (7-4, 4-4) trailed, 20-3, midway through the third quarter. But Eli Manning hit four different teammates for scores during a 14:24 span. He completed his third fourth-quarter comeback of the season with a 39-yard TD strike to freshman receiver Jason Armstead, giving the Rebels a 31–27 lead with 3:34 left.

Scoring summary
 Vanderbilt – M Garrett 26 pass from Zolman (kick failed)
 Mississippi – FG J Nichols 39
 Vanderbilt – Stricker 50 pass from Zolman (Stover kick)
 Vanderbilt – Zolman 3 run (Stover kick)
 Mississippi – C Stackhouse 13 pass from Manning (J Nichols kick)
 Mississippi – Flowers 25 pass from Manning (J Nichols kick)
 Vanderbilt – Mathenia 28 pass from Zolman (Stover kick)
 Mississippi – J Armstrong 15 pass from Manning (J Nichols kick)
 Mississippi – J Armstead 39 pass from Manning (J Nichols kick)
 Mississippi – Gunn 10 run (J Nichols kick)

Player statistics
 Rushing
 Vanderbilt – R Williams 16-96, Stricker 3-15, Zolman 6-9, N Mckenzie 1-minus 1.
 Mississippi – Gunn 32-157, Williams 3-22, Sanford 2-12, C Stackhouse 2-10, Manning 2-1, Team 1-minus 1.
 Passing
 Vanderbilt – Zolman 23-41-2-286.
 Mississippi – Manning 23-40-3-286.
 Receiving
 Vanderbilt – Stricker 11-169, Mathenia 4-49, M Garrett 2-31, R Williams 2-7, Simone 1-21, Hasanoglu 1-4, Smith 1-3, Young 1-2.
 Mississippi – J Armstead 6-91, Flowers 5-72, J Armstrong 4-64, Ch Collins 3-14, C Stackhouse 2-22, Skrmetta 2-20, Williams 1-3.

Team statistics
  Vanderbilt /Mississippi
 First downs 19 /32
 Rushed-yards 26-119/ 42-201
 Passing yards 286 /286
 Sacked-yards lost 1-7/ 0-0
 Return yards 36 /38
 Passes 23-41-2 /23-40-3
 Punts 6-45.2 /4-38.8
 Fumbles-lost 1-1 /0-0
 Penalties-yards 7-54 /5-45
 Time of possession 27:10/ 32:50

Roster

Team Stats

Passing

 
Rushing Receiving Scrimmage
 	 		 	 	 	 	 	 	

Kick & Punt Returns
 

Kicking & Punting

References

Vanderbilt
Vanderbilt Commodores football seasons
Vanderbilt Commodores football